The 2015–16 Tunisian Ligue Professionnelle 2 (Tunisian Professional League) season was the 61st season since Tunisia's independence.

Teams

The 20 teams will be drawn into two groups of 10 teams each. The first three of each group will qualify to the promotion playoff, while the last of each group will be relegated to Ligue 3. The two teams that finish the regular season in the 9th position will play a relegation playoff, a single match to determine who is maintained in Ligue 2 and who is relegated to Ligue 3.
US Monastir, AS Gabès and AS Djerba were the three relegated teams at the end of the 2014-15 Ligue 1 season. On the other hand, STIR Zarzouna, US Siliana and US Tataouine were the three promoted teams at the end of the 2014–15 Ligue 3 season.

Group A

AS Djerba
CS Korba
FC Hammamet
Grombalia Sports
Jendouba Sport
Olympique du Kef
Stade Sportif Sfaxien
Stir Sportive Zarzouna
US Monastir
Union Sportive Sbeitla

Group B

AS Ariana
AS Gabès
CS M'saken
El Makarem de Mahdia
ES Hammam-Sousse
Olympique Béja
Sfax Railway Sports
Sporting Ben Arous
US Siliana
US Tataouine

Results

Group A

Group A table

Group A result table

Group B

Group B table

Group B result table

Playoffs

Promotion Playoffs

Promotion Playoffs table

Promotion Playoffs result table

Relegation playoff

Relegated teams
 US Sbeitla on 30 March 2016 (Week 18 out of 18)
 El Makarem de Mahdia on 30 March 2016 (Week 18 out of 18)
 Stir Sportive Zarzouna on 16 April 2016 (relegation playoff)

See also
2015–16 Tunisian Ligue Professionnelle 1
2015–16 Tunisian Ligue Professionnelle 3
2015–16 Tunisian Cup

References

External links
 2015–16 Ligue 2 on RSSSF.com
 Tunisian Football Federation

Tuni
Tunisian Ligue Professionnelle 2 seasons